General Sir Brian Leslie Graham Kenny  (18 June 1934 – 19 June 2017) was a senior British Army officer, who served as Deputy Supreme Allied Commander Europe from 1990 until his retirement in 1993.

Early life 
Brian Leslie Graham Kenny was born on 18 June 1934 at Louise Margaret Hospital in Aldershot, Hampshire. Brian Kenny was born to Royal Artillery officer, Brigadier James Wolfenden Kenny (1899–1978), and Aileen Anne Georgina Kenny (1903–1995).

Kenny was educated at Canford School, a public school in Wimborne, Dorset from 1948 to 1952.

Military career
From 1952 to 1954, Kenny attended the Royal Military Academy Sandhurst, graduating with the sword of honour.

Kenny was commissioned into the 4th Queen's Own Hussars in 1954. He rose to be General Officer Commanding (GOC) 1st Armoured Division in 1982; he took up an appointment as Director of Army Staff Duties at the Ministry of Defence in 1984 before becoming GOC 1st Corps in 1985 and then GOC of British Army of the Rhine in 1987. He was appointed Deputy Supreme Allied Commander Europe in 1990 and retired in 1993. He was also Colonel Commandant of the Royal Armoured Corps.

Retirement and death
Kenny retired from the British Army in 1993.

Kenny was Governor of the Royal Hospital Chelsea from 1993 to 1999. He was King of Arms of the Order of the Bath from 1999 to 2009.

Kenny died of complications associated with Alzheimer's disease at Lyle House care home in Putney, London on 19 June 2017, at the age of 83. Kenny was buried in Tarrant Gunville, Dorset. He was survived by his wife, Diana, and their son, as well as four grandchildren.

Personal life 
Kenny married Diana Catherine Jane Mathew at the parish church of Crewkerne, Somerset on 9 August 1958. They had two sons together, Timothy and Stephen. Kenny was fluent in French and German.

References

|-
 

|-

|-

 
|-

1934 births
2017 deaths
Burials in Dorset
British Army generals
Knights Grand Cross of the Order of the Bath
Commanders of the Order of the British Empire
4th Queen's Own Hussars officers
People educated at Canford School
Queen's Royal Irish Hussars officers
NATO military personnel
Place of birth missing
Place of death missing
Military personnel from Aldershot